Lepidomuricea is a genus of corals belonging to the family Plexauridae.

The species of this genus are found in Australia, India.

Species:

Lepidomuricea ramosa 
Lepidomuricea spicata

References

Plexauridae
Octocorallia genera